The Chinese records in swimming are ratified by the China's governing body in swimming, Chinese Swimming Association (CSA).

All records were achieved in finals unless otherwise noted.

Long course (50 m)

Men

Women

Mixed relay

Short course (25 m)

Men

Women

Mixed relay

References
General
 (Chinese) Chinese Long Course Records  7 September 2006 updated
 (Chinese) Chinese Short Course Records 26 January 2003 updated
Specific

External links
 CSA web site 

China
Records
Swimming
Swimming